Burshtyn TES is a coal-fired power plant of Zakhidenergo located in Ivano-Frankivsk Raion  south-east from Burshtyn, Ivano-Frankivsk Oblast, Ukraine. It is part of Rinat Akhmetov's holdings. It was struck by four Russian missiles on 10th of October 2022, amidst massive rocket shelling on Ukraine.

The plant has two chimneys which were built in 1966 are also used as high-voltage pylon.  The plant has 12 units with a total installed capacity of 2,334 MW. It has a 330 kV double-circuit connection to the 750/330 kV substation called ZahidnoUkrainska (WestUkraine).

The rest of Ukraine was connected to the Soviet-era IPS/UPS network (effectively controlled by Russia) until early 2022, when it switched to the synchronous grid of Continental Europe, controlled by European Network of Transmission System Operators for Electricity (ENTSO-E). The part of the Ukrainian power grid called Burshtyn Island has been connected to the European grid since 2003. The power plant holds the frequency and phase angle in the Island. The power plant has a 400 kV connection to the Hungarian, Slovak and Romanian grid via the substation at Mukachevo.

History 

The Burshtyn TES (formerly Burshtyn GRES, renamed in 1996) was built from 1962 to 1969. The plant was built using concrete block technology. The equipments of the plant were manufactured by more than one hundred companies. In 1965, first gas-fired power unit having a total power of 200 MW were finished. In 1969, the twelfth unit was finished and the plant has been launched into service for "Lvivenergo" with a total capacity of 2,300 MW. Among some other power stations of the company were Dobrotvir TES and Rivne Nuclear Power Plant. In 1975, a computer-based monitoring system was installed. From 1978 to 1980, to reduce pollutant emission, electrostatic ash filters were added to the plant. The ash from filters is used by the building industry to produce cement. In 1984, all of the 12 units has been modified to be able to be fired with natural gas. From 1985 to 1990, the power units no. 9 and 10 has been equipped with asynchronous-synchronous turbogenerators type ASTG-200. This helps to reduce reactive power and increase efficiency and stability. From 1995, according to a presidential order, the power plant became an independent organization and part of the power generating open joint-stock company Zakhidenergo that included Dobrotvir TES and Ladyzhyn TES (part of the former "Vinnytsiaenergo").

The Burshtyn Island 

From 1 July 2002, the power plant and several substations connected to it have been disconnected from the IPS power system of Ukraine.  The plant, with these substations, and customers served by the plant/substations together called "Burshtyn Island".  The island connects also the 200 MW Kaluska CHPP gas power plant and 27 MW Tereblia-Rikska hydro station, both synchronized to BuTES (Burshtyn TES). The island is synchronized and connected to the ENTO-E/UCTE grid via the power systems of Slovakia, Hungary and Romania with 220 kV, 400 kV and 750 kV transmission lines. The purpose of the island is to accelerate the integration of the Ukrainian IPS into the ENTSO-E Continental Europe region.

Fuel supplement 

The most common fuel of the plant is coal, which is from Lviv Voliny coalfield, but coal from Donetsk is also used. The plant is also fueled with natural gas and petroleum. The plant can provide higher efficiency with non-solid fuel, because it does not make ash. The coolant water is supplied from a water catchment lake with a surface of 2000 hectares (approx. 50 million cubic meters).

Flue gas stacks 

See also

 Zakhidenergo
 Rzeszów–Khmelnytskyi powerline

References

External links

 http://skyscraperpage.com/diagrams/?buildingID=76978
 https://web.archive.org/web/20100914133528/http://burshtyn.br.if.ua/Organization/index.htm
 https://web.archive.org/web/20091225135838/http://www.zakhidenergo.ua/ua/subsections.php?s=btes

Coal-fired power stations in Ukraine
Natural gas-fired power stations in Ukraine
Oil-fired power stations in Ukraine
Power stations built in the Soviet Union